ISO 639 is a set of international standards that lists short codes for language names. The following is a complete list of three-letter codes defined in part two (ISO 639-2) of the standard, including the corresponding two-letter (ISO 639-1) codes where they exist.

Where two ISO 639-2 codes are given in the table, the one with the asterisk is the bibliographic code (B code) and the other is the terminological code (T code).

Entries in the Scope column distinguish:

 individual language
collections of languages connected, for example genetically or by region
macrolanguages.

The Type column distinguishes:
 ancient languages (extinct since ancient times);
 historical languages (distinct from their modern form);
extinct languages in recent times;
 constructed languages.

The standard includes some codes for special situations:
 mis, for "uncoded languages";
 mul, for "multiple languages";
 qaa-qtz, a range reserved for local use.
 und, for "undetermined";
 zxx, for "no linguistic content; not applicable";

*Synonyms for terminology applications (ISO 639-2/T) and for *bibliographic applications (ISO 639-2/B)

Notes

See also
 Lists of ISO 639 codes

References

External links
 ISO 639-2:1998 - ISO.org
 ISO 639-2 Registration Authority - Library of Congress

 ISO 639-2 codes, List of